The priesthood of all believers or universal priesthood is a biblical principle in most Protestant branches of Christianity which is distinct from the institution of the ministerial priesthood (holy orders) found in some other branches, including the Roman Catholic and Eastern Orthodox. Derived from the Bible and elaborated in the theology of Martin Luther and John Calvin, the principle became prominent as a tenet of Protestant Christian doctrine, though the exact meaning of the belief and its implications vary widely among denominations.

Before Protestantism 
The Odes of Solomon has an early understanding of a view of the priesthood of all believers, suggesting that Jewish-Christians in the region of Antioch believed themselves to be priests of God making spiritual sacrifices.

Tertullian held a belief like the priesthood of all believers, however his views on the laity were influenced by Montanism. As the Montanists believed in the priesthood of every believer.

Irenaeus has been argued to have held to a view of universal priesthood because he stated "for all the righteous possess the sacerdotal rank".

History within Protestantism

The universal priesthood of all believers is a foundational concept of Protestantism. While Martin Luther did not use the exact phrase "priesthood of all believers", he adduces a general priesthood in Christendom in his 1520 To the Christian Nobility of the German Nation in order to dismiss the medieval view that Christians in the present life were to be divided into two classes: "spiritual" and "secular". He put forward the doctrine that all baptized Christians are "priests" and "spiritual" in the sight of God:

Two months later Luther would write in his On the Babylonian Captivity of the Church (1520):

The Bible passage considered to be the basis of this belief is the :

(This New Living Translation version reflects the Protestant view, as the universal "royal priesthood" from the Bible Luther cites above has been changed to individual "royal priests".)

In ancient Israel, priests acted as mediators between God and people. They ministered according to God's instruction and they offered sacrifices to God on behalf of the people. Once a year, the high priest would enter the holiest part of the temple and offer a sacrifice for the sins of all the people, including all the priests.

Although many religions use priests, most Protestant faiths reject the idea of a priesthood as a group that is spiritually distinct from lay people. They typically employ professional clergy who perform many of the same functions as priests such as clarifying doctrine, administering communion, performing baptisms, marriages, etc. In many instances, Protestants see professional clergy as servants acting on behalf of the local believers. This is in contrast to the priest, whom some Protestants see as having a distinct authority and spiritual role different from that of ordinary believers. British Quakers (Society of Friends) and US and African Quakers  in some cases, have no priests and no order of service. God can speak through any person present; and any planned service is at risk of getting in God's way; hence the bulk of the observance is in silence.

Most Protestants today recognize only Christ as a mediator between themselves and God. The Epistle to the Hebrews calls Jesus the supreme "high priest," who offered himself as a perfect sacrifice (Hebrews 7:23–28).  Protestants believe that through Christ they have been given direct access to God, just like a priest; thus the doctrine is called the priesthood of all believers.  God is equally accessible to all the faithful, and every Christian has equal potential to minister for God. This doctrine stands in opposition to the concept of a spiritual aristocracy or hierarchy within Christianity. (See Clericalism)

The belief in the priesthood of all believers does not preclude order, authority or discipline within congregations or denominational organizations. For example, Lutheranism maintains the biblical doctrine of "the preaching office" or the "office of the holy ministry" established by God in the Christian Church. The Augsburg Confession states:

The origins of the doctrine within Protestantism are somewhat obscure. The idea was found in a radical form in Lollard thought. Martin Luther adduced it in his writings for the purpose of reforming the Christian Church, and it became a central tenet of Protestantism.

The doctrine is strongly asserted within Methodism and the Plymouth Brethren movement. Within Methodism it can plausibly be linked to the strong emphasis on social action and political involvement within that denomination, and can be seen in the role of Methodist local preachers and lay speakers in Methodist churches. Within the Plymouth Brethren, the concept is most usually evidenced in the lack of distinction between "clergy" and "laity," the refusal to adopt formal titles such as Reverend or Bishop, the denial of formal ordination, and in some cases the refusal to hire any "professional staff" or paid Christian workers at all. Baptist movements, which generally operate on a form of congregational polity, also lean heavily on this concept. The Laestadian pietist movement has a specific interpretation of the doctrine as underlying its solemn rite concerning the declaration of the forgiveness of sins.

The vast majority of Protestants nonetheless draw some distinction between their own ordained ministers and lay people. Pastors and ordained ministers are usually regarded as congregational leaders and theologians who are well versed with Christian liturgy, scripture, church teachings and are qualified to lead worship and preach sermons.

Some groups during the Reformation believed that priesthood authority was still needed, but was lost from the earth. Roger Williams believed, "There is no regularly constituted church of Christ on earth, nor any person qualified to administer any church ordinances; nor can there be until new apostles are sent by the Great Head of the Church for whose coming I am seeking." Another group, the Seekers, believed that the Roman Catholic Church had lost its authority through corruption and waited for Christ to restore his true church and authority.

Consequences of Luther's doctrine

Luther's doctrine of the universal priesthood of all believers gave laypersons and the clergy equal rights and responsibilities. It had strong, far-reaching consequences both within the Protestant churches and outside of them with respect to the development of distinct political and societal structures.

Luther had the intention to organize the church in such a way as to give the members of a congregation the right to elect a pastor by majority-decision and, if necessary, to dismiss him again. The Lutheran church would get an institutional framework based on the majoritarian principle, the central characteristic of democracy. But mainly due to the strong political and military pressure from the Catholic powers, the developing Lutheran churches in the German territories had to seek the protection of their worldly rulers who turned them into state churches. In the Scandinavian countries, Lutheran state churches were established, too.

Calvin put Luther's intended democratic church polity into effect. The church members elected lay elders from their midst who together with pastors, teachers, and deacons, who were also elected by the parishioners, formed the representative church leadership. To this presbyterian polity, the Huguenots added regional synods and a national synod, whose members, laymen and clergymen alike, were elected by the parishioners as well. This combination of presbyteries and synods was taken over by all Reformed churches, except the Congregationalists, who had no synods.

The Separatist Congregationalists (Pilgrim Fathers) who founded Plymouth Colony in North America in 1620 took the next step in evolving the consequences of Luther's universal priesthood doctrine by combining it with the Federal theology that had been developed by Calvinist theologians, especially Robert Browne, Henry Barrowe, and John Greenwood. On the basis of the Mayflower Compact, a social contract, the Pilgrims applied the principles that guided their congregational democracy also to the administration of the worldly affairs of their community. It was, like Massachusetts Bay Colony, founded by Puritans in 1628, de facto a small democratic, self-governing republic until 1691, when the two colonies were united under a royal governor. Both colonies had a representative political structure and practiced separation of powers. The General Court functioned as the legislative and the judiciary, the annually elected governor and his assistants were the executive branch of government. These Protestants believed that democracy was the will of God. In so doing, they followed Calvin, who had, in order to safeguard the rights and liberties of ordinary people, praised the advantages of democracy and recommended that political power should be distributed among several institutions to minimise its misuse. He had, in effect, advocated separation of powers.

In Rhode Island (1636), Connecticut (1636), and Pennsylvania (1682), Baptist Roger Williams, Congregationalist Thomas Hooker, and Quaker William Penn, respectively, gave the democratic concept another turn by linking it with religious freedom, a basic human right that had its origin also in Luther's theology. In his view, faith in Jesus Christ was the free gift of the Holy Spirit and could therefore not be forced on a person. Williams, Hooker, and Penn adopted Luther's position. Precondition for granting freedom of conscience in their colonies was the separation of state and church. This had been made possible by Luther's separation of the spiritual and the worldly spheres in his doctrine of the two kingdoms. The inseparable combination of democracy with its civil rights on the one hand and religious freedom and other human rights on the other hand became the backbone of the American Declaration of Independence (1776), Constitution, and Bill of Rights. In turn, these documents became models for the constitutions of nations in Europe, Latin America, and other parts of the world, e.g., Japan and South Korea. The French Declaration of the Rights of Man and of the Citizen (1789) was mainly based on the draft of Marquis de Lafayette, an ardent supporter of the American constitutional principles. These are also echoed in the United Nations Charter and Declaration of Human Rights.

When Lutherans from Germany and Scandinavia emigrated to North America, they took over the church polity based on presbyteries and synods which had been developed by the denominations with Calvinist traditions (for example, Lutheran Church–Missouri Synod). In Germany, Lutheran churches established the first presbyteries in the second half of the nineteenth century and, after the downfall of the monarchies in 1918, synods were formed which assumed the task of leading the churches. They are made up of both laypersons and clergy. Since 1919, the Anglican church has also had a synod (National Assembly), which has elected laypersons among its members.

A practical example of the priesthood of all believers may be found in modern Anabaptist churches, such as the Amish, Bruderhof and Hutterites.  While these groups appoint leaders, it is held that all members are responsible for the functioning of the church and church meetings.  For example, at the Bruderhof, meetings are held with members sitting in a circle, breaking down the tradition of "preacher" and "congregation".

Priesthood in non-Protestant faiths

Roman Catholic, Eastern Orthodox and Anglican Christians traditionally believe that 1 Peter 2:9 gives responsibility to all believers for the preservation and propagation of the Gospel and the Church, as distinct from the liturgical and sacramental roles of the ordained priesthood and consecrated episcopate (see apostolic succession). They and other Christians also see the ministerial priesthood as being necessary in accordance with the words of the eucharistic liturgy: "Do this in memory (anamnesis) of me" (Gospel of Luke 22:19–20; First Corinthians 11:23–25).

The dogmatic constitution Lumen gentium of the Second Vatican Council specifically highlights the priesthood of all believers. It teaches that the Church's relationship with God is independent of whatever ordination people have received, as evidenced by the guidelines and rubrics for personal prayer when no priest is present. Such Churches have always taught implicitly that a Christian's personal relationship with God is independent of whatever ordination they have received.

Thus, the Catholic Church accepts the 'priesthood of all believers' doctrine – it is not the exclusive domain of Protestantism. This is exemplified in 'chaplet of divine mercy' prayer, in which the individual Christian declares: "Eternal Father, I offer you the Body and Blood, Soul and Divinity, of your dearly beloved Son, our Lord Jesus Christ, in atonement for our sins..." The primary difference between the teachings of the Catholic Church and those of the (non-Anglican) Protestant churches that reject the ordained priesthood is that the Catholic Church believes in three different types of priests:
 first, the priesthood of all believers (1 Peter 2:5–9)
 second, the ordained priesthood (Acts 14:23, Romans 15:16, 1 Timothy 5:17, Titus 1:5, James 5:14–15); and
 third, the high priesthood of Jesus (Hebrews 3:1).
However, it is important to note that in Catholic doctrine, no manifestation of priesthood is of a specific individual, but of the priesthood of Jesus Christ. The laity and the clergy alike only participate in Christ's priesthood.

Problems with translations

The former term refers to the sacrificial ritual leaders of Judaism, the kohanim, and to those holding the office of conducting sacrifices in ancient pagan temples, whereas the latter term refers to an acknowledged elder of a community.

The earliest Christianity is not recorded as ever having created an office of hiereus, except to acknowledge Jesus in that role, and as in the Greek of 1 Peter 2:9, to recognize the Church as having it in a collective sense. The New Testament records the role of presbyter or bishop (or episkopos which literally means "overseer") in the earliest Christian churches as the role ordained by the Apostles to the earliest acknowledged leaders of the Church. Saying that all Christians are a "sacred one" (i.e. hiereus) is not to say that each Christian is "one with elderhood" (i.e. presbyteros).

Catholicism often expresses the idea of the priesthood of all baptized Christians in English as the "common" or "universal" priesthood; in parallel, it refers to Catholic clergy as the "ministerial" priesthood. It defends this distinction with the original language of scripture. The Catholic Church holds that the consecration of the eucharist and absolution from sin may only be validly performed by ministerial priests with true apostolic succession. The Orthodox hold a very similar view.

See also
Lay preacher

Notes

Literature

 Christopher Fennell (1998), Plymouth Colony Legal Structure, www.histarch.Illinois.edu/plymouth/ccflaw.html
 Friedrich Wilhelm Graf (2010), Der Protestantismus. Geschichte und Gegenwart, Second, Revised Edition, Munich (Germany), 
 Karl Heussi (1957), Kompendium der Kirchengeschichte, Eleventh Edition, Tübingen (Germany)
 Thomas S. Kidd (2010), God of Liberty: A Religious History of the American Revolution, Pennsylvania, Pa., 
 Robert Middlekauff (2005), The Glorious Cause: The American Revolution, 1763-1789, Revised and Expanded Edition, Oxford University Press, 
 Clifton E. Olmstead (1960), History of Religion in the United States, Englewood Cliffs, N.J. 
 Nathaniel Philbrick (2006), Mayflower: A Story of Courage, Community, and War, New York, N.Y., 
 Jeremy Waldron (2002), God, Locke, and Equality: Christian Foundations in Locke's Political Thought, Cambridge University Press, Cambridge (UK), 
 Allen Weinstein and David Rubel (2002), The Story of America: Freedom and Crisis from Settlement to Superpower, New York, N.Y., 
 Abdel Ross Wentz (1954), A Basic History of Lutheranism in America, Philadelphia, Pa.
 Heinrich August Winkler (2012), Geschichte des Westens. Von den Anfängen in der Antike bis zum 20. Jahrhundert, Third Edition, Munich (Germany),

External links
 
 "The Priesthood of All Believers and Other Pious Myths" by Timothy Wengert
 "Luther and the Priesthood of All Believers" by Norman Nagel
 "What the Priesthood of All Believers Means" by Simon Perry

Christian terminology
Lutheran theology
Protestant theology
Quaker theology